Jeffrey Jones  ( – 1976) was a Welsh international footballer. He was part of the Wales national football team between 1908 and 1910, playing 3 matches. He played his first match on 11  April 1908 against Ireland and his last match on 5 March 1910 against Scotland.

See also
 List of Wales international footballers (alphabetical)

References

1886 births
1976 deaths
Welsh footballers
Wales international footballers
Place of birth missing
Date of death missing
Association footballers not categorized by position